Mónica Haydée Fein (born 3 June 1957) is an Argentine biochemist and Socialist Party politician who was intendente (mayor) of Rosario from 2011 to 2019. She has been a National Deputy since 2021, and previously held the same position from 2007 to 2011.

Since 2021, she has been president of the Socialist Party.

Early life and education
Fein was born in Luján, Buenos Aires Province. 
She became active in politics at age 17, joining the Popular Socialist Party. She participated in the National Reform Movement as President of the Student Center of the School of Biochemistry and Pharmacy at the National University of Rosario, where she graduated with a degree in Biochemistry. She then served as Secretary of Student Welfare, as Faculty Graduate Advisor, and as Secretary of the UNR University Extension.

She began her training in Public Health at the Lazarte Institute. She participated in the creation of the Laboratory for Proprietary Medicinal (LEM) for the City of Rosario in 1992; the LEM, which coordinated its development with academia, would become a national model for the public production of pharmaceuticals. Fein was appointed Director of the City Sanitation Department in 1995, where she promoted more active food safety control by developing the Food Institute, a pioneer in Argentina in the field of locally based public food safety education and quality inspection.

Political career
Hermes Binner, a fellow Socialist elected mayor of the city, appointed Fein Secretary of Public Health in 1997. She strengthened the local primary care network, focused efforts on hospital standards, and launched the Center for Ambulatory Medical Specialties of Rosario (CEMAR). She headed the party list of Socialist candidates to the City Council in 2001, and remained in the post until 2003, serving as President of the Health Commission.

Mayor Miguel Lifschitz retained Fein as Secretary of Public Health. She oversaw construction of the new Martín Maternity facility, and her management was recognized by the World Health Organization. She was elected to the Argentine Chamber of Deputies in 2007 for the Santa Fe Civic and Social Progressive Front, which led the Socialist Party caucus therein, and Fein was elected caucus president. She was named Secretary of the Commission for Social Action and Public Health, and also served in the Committees on Rules, Taxes, Constitutional Affairs, General Legislation, Population and Human Development, and the Elderly.

She was nominated as candidate for mayor of the city of Rosario by the Progressive, Civic and Social Front on May 22, 2011. She was elected on July 24 with 52.2% of the vote, defeating the runner-up, Héctor Cavallero, by 22% and becoming the first Socialist woman elected mayor in Argentine history.

References

External links

 (in Spanish)

1957 births
Living people
People from Luján, Buenos Aires
National University of Rosario alumni
Argentine biochemists
Argentine women scientists
Women biochemists
20th-century women scientists
Socialist Party (Argentina) politicians
Members of the Argentine Chamber of Deputies elected in Santa Fe
Mayors of Rosario, Santa Fe
Women members of the Argentine Chamber of Deputies
Women mayors of places in Argentina